Dmitriy Igorevich Balandin (born 4 April 1995) is a retired Kazakh breaststroke swimmer. He won the 200 m breaststroke at the 2016 Summer Olympics, as well as the 50, 100 and 200 m breaststroke events at the 2014 Asian Games.

Career
Balandin currently holds two Kazakh records in the 100 and 200 m breaststroke, and also set a historic milestone for his nation by striking the breaststroke triple at the 2014 Asian Games in Incheon, South Korea.
 
In the 2016 Rio Olympics, Balandin won a gold medal in the 200 m breaststroke, setting up new national record with 2:07.46. This was his first Olympic medal, and Kazakhstan's first-ever medal in a swimming event.

Balandin emerged as an unexpected medal contender at the 2014 Asian Games in Incheon, where he competed in all breaststroke events. In the men's 200 m breaststroke, Balandin moved from a top seed in the prelims to stun the entire crowd and crush the twelve-year-old meet record set by Japanese swimmer and four-time Olympic champion Kosuke Kitajima in a time of 2:07.67 for the gold medal, jumping him into third in the world rankings. The following day, in the men's 100 m breaststroke, Balandin threw down a Kazakh record in 59.92 to pick up his second gold of the meet. Additionally, he raced his stretch to overhaul a minute barrier for the first time in Asian Games history. On the final day of swimming, Balandin completed a remarkable meet with another Games record of 27.78 for his third straight gold of the meet in the 50 m breaststroke.

Recognition 
In 2016, a new pool was opened and named after Dmitry Balandin at Al-Farabi Kazakh National University in Alma-Ata.

In 2016, Dmitry Balandin was chosen as one of the nominees in the "proposed candidates" category of the national project «El Tulgasy» (Name of the Motherland) The idea of the project was to select the most significant citizens of Kazakhstan whose names are now associated with the achievements of the country. More than 350,000 people voted in this project, and Balandin was voted into 3rd place in his category.

Personal best times

References

External links

Profile – Aquatics Kazakhstan

1995 births
Living people
Sportspeople from Almaty
Kazakhstani people of Russian descent
Kazakhstani male breaststroke swimmers
Swimmers at the 2016 Summer Olympics
Olympic swimmers of Kazakhstan
Olympic gold medalists for Kazakhstan
Medalists at the 2016 Summer Olympics
Olympic gold medalists in swimming
Swimmers at the 2014 Asian Games
Swimmers at the 2018 Asian Games
Asian Games gold medalists for Kazakhstan
Asian Games bronze medalists for Kazakhstan
Asian Games medalists in swimming
Medalists at the 2014 Asian Games
Medalists at the 2018 Asian Games
Universiade medalists in swimming
Universiade gold medalists for Kazakhstan
Universiade silver medalists for Kazakhstan
Universiade bronze medalists for Kazakhstan
Medalists at the 2015 Summer Universiade
Medalists at the 2017 Summer Universiade
Swimmers at the 2020 Summer Olympics
21st-century Kazakhstani people